Matthew Lowber House is a historic home located at Magnolia, Kent County, Delaware.  It was built in 1774, and is a two-story, three bay, brick dwelling, with a two bay frame addition added about 1855.  The interior has excellent panelling, the original wide floor boards, and a winding enclosed stairway. An addition was added to the back of the house in 2020.

It was listed on the National Register of Historic Places in 1973.

References

External links

Houses on the National Register of Historic Places in Delaware
Houses completed in 1774
Houses in Kent County, Delaware
Historic American Buildings Survey in Delaware
National Register of Historic Places in Kent County, Delaware